Charlotte Cameron (née Wales-Almy, 1869/1872 or 1873 – 9 December 1946) was an American traveller and author.

Biography
Cameron was the daughter of Frances (Fanny) Sisson Faulkner, a suffragette (1847-1920) and Jacob Wales-Almy, a captain in the Royal Navy (1838 - 1919). She was born in Portsmouth, Rhode Island, USA.

Cameron travelled extensively and wrote about her travels. She travelled to Scotland in 1893, and in 1904 travelled as a companion to a wealthy Englishwoman. In 1918 she visited her mother in Portsmouth and gave public talks about her travels. In 1921 she visited Australia.

Cameron was elected a Fellow of the Royal Geographical Society in 1913 and received the Order of the British Empire following the First World War.

Cameron died on 9 December 1946 in London, England.

Personal life 
Cameron had two marriages: first to Major Donald Cameron (d before 1901). Her second husband was Auguste Ernest George Jacquemard de Landresse (b. 1872/3); they married on 29 May 1901 and divorced in 1905.

Publications

 Cameron, C. (1911). A passion in Morocco. A novel. Stanley Paul & Co: London.
Cameron, C. (1912). A woman's winter in South America. Boston: Small, Maynard.
Cameron, C. (1912). A Durbar bride. London: Stanley Paul.
Cameron, C. W.-A. (1913). A woman's winter in Africa: A 26,000 mile journey. London: S. Paul & Co.
Cameron, C. (1916). Zenia: Spy in Togoland. London: T. Werner Laurie.
Cameron, C. (1920). A cheechako in Alaska and Yukon. London: T. FisherUnwin.
Cameron, C. (1923). Two Years in Southern seas, by Charlotte Cameron. London: T. Fisher Unwin.
Cameron, C. (1924). Wandering in South-Eastern seas, by Charlotte Cameron. London: T. Fisher Unwin.
Cameron, C. (1925). Mexico in revolution, an account of an English woman's experiences & adventures in the land of revolution. London: Seeley, Service & Co.

References 

1870s births
1946 deaths
American travel writers
20th-century American women writers
American women travel writers
Fellows of the Royal Geographical Society
Writers from Rhode Island
Members of the Order of the British Empire
American people of British descent